Psyllotoxoides albomaculata is a species of beetle in the family Cerambycidae, and the only species in the genus Psyllotoxoides. It was described by Stephan von Breuning in 1961.

References

Onciderini
Beetles described in 1961